Alexander McCuish (January 3, 1843 – July 1, 1919) was a merchant and political figure in Nova Scotia, Canada. He represented Richmond County in the Nova Scotia House of Assembly as a Conservative member from 1878 to 1882.

He was born in Loch Lomond, Nova Scotia, the son of Archibald McCuish and Jane McDonald, both Scottish immigrants. He first farmed and was involved in mining before establishing himself in business, mainly trading in fishing supplies. McCuish was a justice of the peace. In 1872, he married Jessie Ann McPhee. McCuish was a member of the Freemasons. He died in 1919.

References 

The Canadian biographical dictionary and portrait gallery of eminent and self-made men ... (1991)

1843 births
1919 deaths
Progressive Conservative Association of Nova Scotia MLAs
People from Richmond County, Nova Scotia
Canadian justices of the peace